Tickner is a topographic surname of English origin for someone who lived at a crossroad or a fork in the road. Notable people with the surname include:

 Blair Tickner (born 1993), cricketer
 Charles Tickner (born 1953), figure skater
 Frank Tickner (born 1983), British cross country runner
 French Tickner (born 1930), American-Canadian voice actor
 George Tickner (born 1946), musician
 J. Ann Tickner, academic
 Lisa Tickner, British art historian
 Robert Tickner (born 1951), politician
 Royston Tickner (1922–1997), actor
 T. F. Tickner (1864-1924), British architect
 M. P. Tickner (born 1972), Government Advisor

See also 
 
 Tichenor
 Ticknor

References 

English-language surnames